There are two Virginia Tech Hokies soccer teams:

Virginia Tech Hokies men's soccer
Virginia Tech Hokies women's soccer